Virginia's 20th Senate district is one of 40 districts in the Senate of Virginia. It has been represented by Republican Bill Stanley since 2012; prior to 2011 redistricting, Stanley represented the 19th district.

Geography
District 20 is based in Virginia's western Southside, incorporating all of Henry County, Patrick County, Martinsville, and Galax, as well as parts of Carroll County, Franklin County, Halifax County, Pittsylvania County, and the City of Danville.

The district overlaps with Virginia's 5th and 9th congressional districts, and with the 5th, 6th, 9th, 14th, 16th, and 60th districts of the Virginia House of Delegates. It borders the state of North Carolina.

Recent election results

2019

2015

2011

2011 redistricting placed Bill Stanley, the Republican incumbent from the 19th district, in the same district as Democrat Roscoe Reynolds, the incumbent from the 20th district, resulting in an incumbent-vs-incumbent general election.

Federal and statewide results in District 20

Historical results
All election results below took place prior to 2011 redistricting, and thus were under different district lines.

2007

2003

1999

1996 special

1995

Decades earlier, District 20 consisted of Campbell County, Virginia and Lynchburg slightly further north.

References

Virginia Senate districts
Bedford County, Virginia
Carroll County, Virginia
Danville, Virginia
Franklin County, Virginia
Galax, Virginia
Halifax County, Virginia
Henry County, Virginia
Martinsville, Virginia
Patrick County, Virginia
Pittsylvania County, Virginia